Cornelius Lance "Connie" Hawkins (July 17, 1942 – October 6, 2017) was an American professional basketball player. A New York City playground legend, "the Hawk"
was inducted into the Naismith Memorial Basketball Hall of Fame in 1992.

Early years
Hawkins was born in the Bedford-Stuyvesant section of Brooklyn, where he attended Boys High School, and played for coach Mickey Fisher. Hawkins soon became a fixture at Rucker Park, a legendary outdoor court where he battled against some of the best players in the world.

Hawkins did not play much until his junior year at Boys High. Hawkins was All-City first team as a junior as Boys went undefeated and won New York's Public Schools Athletic League (PSAL) title in 1959. During his senior year he averaged 25.5 points per game, including one game in which he scored 60, and Boys again went undefeated and won the 1960 PSAL title. Hawkins then signed a scholarship offer to play at the University of Iowa.

College and investigation into point-shaving
During Hawkins' freshman year at Iowa, he was a victim of the hysteria surrounding a point-shaving scandal that had started in New York City. Hawkins' name surfaced in an interview conducted with an individual who was involved in the scandal. While some of the conspirators and characters involved were known to or knew Hawkins, none – including the New York attorney at the center of the scandal, Jack Molinas – had ever sought to involve Hawkins in the conspiracy. Hawkins had borrowed $200 ($ in current dollar terms) from Molinas for school expenses, which his brother Fred repaid before the scandal broke in 1961. The scandal became known as the 1961 college basketball gambling scandal.

Despite the fact that Hawkins could not have been involved in point-shaving (as a freshman, due to NCAA rules of the time, he was ineligible to participate in varsity-level athletics), he was kept from seeking legal counsel while being grilled by New York City detectives who were investigating the scandal.

Expulsion from Iowa
As a result of the investigation, despite never being arrested or indicted, Hawkins was expelled from Iowa. He was effectively blackballed from the college ranks; no NCAA or NAIA school would offer him a scholarship. NBA commissioner J. Walter Kennedy let it be known that he would not approve any contract for Hawkins to play in the league. At the time, the NBA had a policy barring players who were even remotely involved with point-shaving scandals. As a result, when his class was eligible for the draft in 1964, no team selected him. He went undrafted in 1965 as well before being formally banned from the league in 1966.

Professional career

Pittsburgh Rens (1961–1963) 

With the major professional basketball league having blackballed him, Hawkins played one season for the Pittsburgh Rens of the American Basketball League (ABL), an aspiring rival to the NBA, and was named the league's most valuable player.

Harlem Globetrotters (1963–1967) 
After that league folded in the middle of the 1962–63 season, Hawkins spent four years performing with the Harlem Globetrotters.

During the time Hawkins was traveling with the Globetrotters, he filed a $6 million lawsuit against the NBA, claiming the league had unfairly banned him from participation and that there was no substantial evidence linking him to gambling activities. Hawkins's lawyers suggested that he participate in the new American Basketball Association (ABA) as a way to establish his talent level as adequate to participate in the NBA, as well as an immediate source of income.

Pittsburgh/Minnesota Pipers (1967–1969) 
Hawkins joined the Pittsburgh Pipers in the inaugural 1967–68 season of the ABA, leading the team to a 54–24 regular season record and the 1968 ABA championship. Hawkins led the ABA in scoring that year and won both the ABA's regular season and playoff MVP awards.

The Pipers moved to Minnesota for the 1968–69 season, and injuries limited Hawkins to 47 games. Hawkins had surgery on his knee. The Pipers made the playoffs despite injuries to their top four players, but were eliminated in the first round of the playoffs. Following the playoffs, the Pipers franchise moved back to Pittsburgh.

Hawkins' lawyer, Roslyn Litman, and her husband, fellow lawyer S. David Litman, who was the brother of the Rens owner, filed an antitrust lawsuit against the NBA in 1966, arguing that the league and its owners blacklisted Hawkins. The NBA had refused to allow any team to hire Hawkins, who at the time the Litmans started working with him was still playing for the Harlem Globetrotters.

In the light of several major media pieces, most notably a Life magazine article written by David Wolf, establishing the dubious nature of the evidence connecting Hawkins to gambling, the NBA concluded it was unlikely to successfully defend the lawsuit. Seeking to avoid a defeat in court which might jeopardize its ability to bar players who had actually participated in gambling, the NBA elected to settle after the 1968–69 season and admit Hawkins to the league. The league agreed to a $1.3M settlement in 1969.

The league paid Hawkins a cash settlement of nearly $1.3 million ($ in current dollar terms), and assigned his rights to the expansion Phoenix Suns. He would be assigned to the Suns as a result of them winning a coin toss over the Seattle SuperSonics. Although the Pipers made a cursory effort to re-sign him, playing in the NBA had been a longtime ambition for Hawkins and he quickly signed with the Suns.

Phoenix Suns (1969–1973) 

In 1969, still recovering from knee surgery in his final ABA season, Hawkins hit the ground running with the Phoenix Suns, when he played 81 games and averaged 24.6 points, 10.4 rebounds and 4.8 assists per game. In the final game of his rookie season, Connie had 44 points, 20 rebounds, 8 assists, 5 blocks and 5 steals. The Suns finished third in the Western Conference, and in the 1970 NBA playoffs they were knocked out by the Los Angeles Lakers in a seven-game Western Conference Semifinals series in which Hawkins carried the Suns against a team that had future Hall of Famers Wilt Chamberlain, Elgin Baylor and Jerry West. In Game 2 of the series, on March 29, 1970, Hawkins led the Suns to a 114-101 victory while scoring 34 points, grabbing 20 rebounds, and recording 7 assists.  For the series, Hawkins averaged 25 points, 14 rebounds and 7 assists per game.

He missed 11 games due to injury during the 1970–71 season, averaging 21 points per game. He matched those stats the next year, and was the top scorer on a per-game basis for the Suns in the 1971–72 season. He averaged a comparatively low 16 points per game for the Suns in the 1972–73 season.

Los Angeles Lakers (1973–1975) 
Averaging 11.3 points nine games into the 1973–74 season and having been replaced in the starting lineup by Mike Bantom, Hawkins was traded from the Suns to the Lakers for Keith Erickson and a 1974 second-round selection (31st overall–Fred Saunders) on October 30.

Atlanta Hawks (1975–1976) 
Injuries limited Hawkins' production in the 1974–75 season, and he finished his career after the 1975–76 season, playing for the Atlanta Hawks.

Milestones
Connie Hawkins was named to the ABA's All-Time Team.

Due to knee problems, Hawkins played in the NBA for only seven seasons. He was an All-Star from 1970 to 1973 and was named to the All-NBA First Team in the 1969–70 season. His No. 42 jersey was retired by the Suns.

Despite being unable to play in the NBA when he was in his prime, Hawkins' performances throughout the ABL, ABA and NBA helped get him inducted into the Naismith Memorial Basketball Hall of Fame in 1992.

Career statistics

Regular season

|-
| style="text-align:left; | 1961-62
| style="text-align:left;"| Pittsburgh (ABL)
| 78 || – ||42.9 || .509 || .167 || .790 || 13.3 || 2.3 || – || – || bgcolor="CFECEC"|27.5*
|-
| style="text-align:left; | 1962-63
| style="text-align:left;"| Pittsburgh (ABL)
| 16 || – ||41.8 || .491 || – || .770 || 12.8 || 2.6 || – || – || 27.9
|-
| style="text-align:left;left;background:#afe6fa;" | †
| style="text-align:left;"| Pittsburgh (ABA)
| 70 || – || bgcolor="CFECEC"|44.9* || .519 || .222 || .764 || 13.5 || 4.6 || – || – || bgcolor="CFECEC"|26.8*
|-
| style="text-align:left" | 
| style="text-align:left;"| Minnesota (ABA)
| 47 || – || 39.4 ||.511 || .136 || .767 || 11.4 || 3.9 || – || – || 30.2
|-
| style="text-align:left;"| 
| style="text-align:left;"| Phoenix
| 81 || – || 40.9 || .490 || – || .779 || 10.4 || 4.8 || – || – || 24.6
|-
| style="text-align:left;"|
| style="text-align:left;"| Phoenix
| 71 || – || 37.5 || .434 || – || .816 || 9.1 || 4.5 || – || – || 20.9
|-
| style="text-align:left;"|
| style="text-align:left;"| Phoenix
| 76 || – || 36.8 || .459 || – || .807 || 8.3 || 3.9 || – || – || 21.0
|-
| style="text-align:left;"| 
| style="text-align:left;"| Phoenix
| 75 || – || 36.9 || .479 || – || .797 || 8.5 || 4.1 || – || – || 16.1
|-
| style="text-align:left;"| 
| style="text-align:left;"| Phoenix
| 8 || – || 27.9 || .486  || – || .667 || 7.2 || 5.2 || 1.4 || 1.0 || 11.3
|-
| style="text-align:left;"| 
| style="text-align:left;"| L.A. Lakers
| 71 || – || 35.7 || .502 || – || .772 || 7.4 || 5.3 || 1.5 || 1.4 || 12.8
|-
| style="text-align:left;"| 
| style="text-align:left;"| L.A. Lakers
| 43 || – || 23.9 || .429 || – || .687 || 4.6 || 2.8 || 1.2 || 0.5 || 8.0
|-
| style="text-align:left;"| 
| style="text-align:left;"| Atlanta
| 74 || – || 25.8 || .447 || –  || .712 || 6.0 || 2.9 || 1.1 || 0.6 || 8.2
|-
|- class="sortbottom"
| style="text-align:center;" colspan=2| Career
| 710 || – || 37.0 || .484 || .162 || .780 || 9.4 || 3.9 || 0.3 || 0.2 || 19.9

Playoffs

|-
| style="text-align:left; | 1962
| style="text-align:left;"| Pittsburgh (ABL)
| 1 || – ||53.0 || .609 || – || .929 || 17.0 || 4.0 || – || – ||41.0
|-
| style="text-align:left;background:#afe6fa;" | 1968†
| style="text-align:left;| Pittsburgh (ABA)
| 14 || – ||44.0 || .594 || – || .729 || 12.3 || 4.6 || – || – || 29.9
|-
| style="text-align:left" | 1969
| style="text-align:left;"| Minnesota (ABA)
| 7 || – || 45.7 ||.378 || .500 || .645 || 12.3 || 3.9 || – || – || 24.9
|-
| style="text-align:left;"| 1970
| style="text-align:left;"| Phoenix
| 7 || – || 46.9 || .413 || – || .818 || 13.9 || 5.9 || – || – || 25.4
|-
| style="text-align:left;"| 1974
| style="text-align:left;"| L.A. Lakers
| 5 || – || 34.4 || .350 || – || .800 || 8.0 || 3.2 || 1.4 || 0.2 || 10.8
|-
|- class="sortbottom"
| style="text-align:center;" colspan=2| Career
| 34 || – || 43.8 || .473 || .500 || .743 || 12.1 || 4.5 || 0.2 || 0.0 || 25.5

Personal life
The Hawkins' story up to 1971 is documented in the biography, Foul by David Wolf, 

In a skit for NBC's Saturday Night Live in 1975, Hawkins played against singer Paul Simon in a one-on-one game accompanied by Simon's song "Me and Julio Down by the Schoolyard." The skit was presented as a schoolyard challenge between the two and had Simon winning, despite the disparity in height between the two men (Simon at 5 ft 3 in, Hawkins at 6 ft 8 in).

One of Hawkins' nephews is Jim McCoy Jr., who scored a school-record 2,374 career points for the UMass Minutemen basketball team from 1988 to 1992.

He was the grandfather of Shawn Hawkins, who played professional basketball internationally and was a two-time scoring champion in Taiwan's Super Basketball League (SBL).

Hawkins retired in Phoenix, Arizona and worked in community relations for the Suns for many years until his death on October 6, 2017, at the age of 75 from cancer; no other cause was given.

In popular culture

Hawkins’ story is the topic of a song titled "The Legend of Connie Hawkins" by Dispatch on their 2021 album Break Our Fall.

References

External links

 Basketball Hall of Fame profile
 Connie Hawkins bio on NBA.com

1942 births
2017 deaths
African-American basketball players
American men's basketball players
Atlanta Hawks players
Banned National Basketball Association players
Basketball players from New York City
Boys High School (Brooklyn) alumni
Centers (basketball)
Harlem Globetrotters players
Los Angeles Lakers players
Minnesota Pipers players
Naismith Memorial Basketball Hall of Fame inductees
National Basketball Association All-Stars
National Basketball Association players with retired numbers
Parade High School All-Americans (boys' basketball)
People from Bedford–Stuyvesant, Brooklyn
Phoenix Suns players
Pittsburgh Pipers players
Pittsburgh Rens players
Power forwards (basketball)
Sportspeople from Brooklyn
Undrafted National Basketball Association players
University of Iowa alumni
20th-century African-American sportspeople
21st-century African-American people